The Canon EF-M was a manual-focus 35mm film, SLR camera which used the Canon EF lens mount. It was introduced in 1991 for export to the non-Japanese market, and was the only manual focus camera in the EF line. It was not sold as part of the EOS range; the camera's official name was Canon EF-M rather than Canon EOS EF-M.

The EF-M was in essence a Canon EOS 1000 without an autofocus system, a built-in flash, or a top-deck LCD. It was priced slightly cheaper than the EOS 1000, and relatively few copies were sold. It was not directly available in Japan, though some were re-imported.

Uniquely amongst Canon EOS bodies it came  with an optical manual focus aid, a split-image focusing screen as well as a ring of microprisms. This system was common with manual focus SLRs but had since fallen out of use in the autofocus era.

External links

Canon camera museum
CANON EF-M

EF-M